David or Dave Clarke may refer to:

Entertainment 
 David Clarke (actor) (1908–2004), American actor
 Dave Clarke (musician) (born 1948), American singer, guitarist, and keyboard player
 Dave Clarke (DJ) (born 1968), English techno DJ
 David Clarke, a character in the TV series Revenge

Politics 
 David Clarke (Australian politician) (born 1947), member of New South Wales Legislative Council
 David Clarke (sheriff) (born 1956), former sheriff of Milwaukee County
 David A. Clarke (1943–1997), founding member of the Washington, D.C. city council

Sports

Football
 Dave Clarke (English footballer) (born 1949), English football goalkeeper
 Dave Clarke (Scottish footballer) (born 1950), Scottish football player and manager
 Dave Clarke (Canadian football) (born 1950), Canadian football player
 David Clarke (Australian footballer, born 1952) (born 1952), Australian rules footballer
 David Clarke (footballer, born 1964), English footballer 
 David Clarke (Paralympic footballer) (born 1970), English five-a-side footballer
 David Clarke (Australian footballer, born 1980) (born 1980), Australian rules footballer
 David Clarke (Gaelic footballer) (born 1983), Gaelic footballer

Other sports
 David Clarke (English cricketer) (born 1967), English cricketer
 David Clarke (Australian cricketer) (born 1970), Australian cricketer
 Dave Clarke (hurler) (born 1971), Irish hurler
 David Clarke (ice hockey) (born 1981), English ice hockey player
 Dave Clarke (rugby league), rugby league footballer for Wales in 2004
 Dave Clarke (runner) (born 1958), British distance runner

Academia 
 David Clarke (journalist) (born 1967), English lecturer and writer on UFO sightings since 2008
 David Clarke (professor), Deputy Vice-Chancellor of Bristol University
 David L. Clarke (1937–1976), English archaeologist
 David R. Clarke, material scientist and physics professor
 David J. Clarke (born 1954), professor of modern and contemporary art at the University of Hong Kong

Religion 
 David Clarke (minister) (born 1946), Moderator of the Presbyterian Church in Ireland 2006
 David Clarke (priest) (born 1923), Anglican priest

Business 
 David Clarke (businessman), Australian businessman
 David S. Clarke (1942–2011), Australian chief executive and winemaker

See also 
 David Clark (disambiguation)